Flying Cowboys is an album by Rickie Lee Jones that was released in September 1989 and produced by Walter Becker of Steely Dan.

Background 
After the release of The Magazine in 1984, Jones retreated from the limelight. She married Pascal Nabet Meyer and gave birth to daughter Charlotte Rose in 1988 while working on her fourth full-length studio album.

Jones and Nabet Meyer had been writing and working together on new material for several years before the recording work commenced in 1988, with Walter Becker as producer. Jones had expressed admiration for the work of Steely Dan, particularly their album The Royal Scam (1976).

Promotional copies of Flying Cowboys were packaged with an interview with Jones conducted by an unknown individual (previously misidentified as LeVar Burton). This interview is the source for a passage that is extensively sampled on British electronic group the Orb's 1990 hit "Little Fluffy Clouds".

Reception

St. Petersburg Times, Oct. 13, 1989 (4/5) – "[She] embraces adulthood and real life without sacrificing her cool, bohemian edge."

Time, Oct. 23, 1989 – "In Flying Cowboys...she sets down a kind of mystical confessional, full of allusive autobiography and reflective nonchalance. It has the breadth of an important book and the emotional impact of great rock 'n' roll."

Rolling Stone, Nov. 2, 1989 (4/5) – "While it explores a wealth of themes and musical styles, the album unfolds with the ongoing grace of one long song. What provides unity to the album's varied elements is its seductive rhythmic flow, the down-home surrealism of Jones's lyrics, the clarity and intelligence of Walter Becker's production and, of course, the sensual elasticity of Jones's extraordinary singing."

The New York Times, Dec. 24, 1989 – Best of 1989 – "Ms. Jones's newest suite of enigmatic dream songs drenched in personal mythology is an eccentric tour de force, as rich in imagery as it is self-dramatizing."

Track listing
All songs written by Rickie Lee Jones, except where noted. Side two of the vinyl release of the album begins with the title track.

Personnel

Musicians
 Rickie Lee Jones – synthesizer, string synthesizer, organ, guitar, steel drums, drum programming, vocals; all instruments (4)
 John Robinson – drums (1, 3, 5, 9)
 Peter Erskine – drums (7, 11)
 Buzz Feiten – guitar (1, 3, 5, 9)
 Dean Parks – guitar (1, 2, 3, 5, 7, 10, 11)
 Greg Phillinganes – keyboards (1, 3, 5)
 Neil Stubenhaus – bass (1, 3, 5, 9, 11)
 Sal Bernardi – guitar, backing vocals (7)
 Jim Keltner – drum machine effects (6)
 Bob Sheppard – saxophone (5, 8)
 Rob Wasserman – bass (8)
 Paulinho da Costa – percussion (8)
 William "Smitty" Smith – organ (1)
 Michael Omartian – piano (1)
 Ed Alton – acoustic bass (2)
 Michael Fisher – percussion (2)
 Gary Coleman – vibraphone (2)
 Bob Zimmitti – percussion (3, 5)
 Chris Dickie – drum programming (4)
 Walter Becker – bass (7)
 Marty Krystall – English horn, clarinet (7), tenor saxophone (9)
 Vince Mendoza – trumpet (7)
 Greg Mathieson – Hammond B3 organ (9)
 Michael Boddicker – string synthesizer (10)
 Pascal Nabet-Meyer – synthesizer, piano (7),  percussion programming (11)
 Randy Brecker – trumpet (11)
 Vonda Shepard – backing vocals
 Chris Smith – harmonica
 Kevin Dorsey, Michael Ruff - backing vocals (1)
 Leslie Smith, The Waters - backing vocals (3)

Production
Walter Becker – producer
Gary Gersh, Pascal Nabet Meyer - executive producers
Greg Penny, Roger Nicols, Mark Linett, Lavant Coppock, Roger Hart – engineer
Jose Esteban Martinez – front cover painting entitled "I am Singing at Your Window"

Charts

References

External links

Rickie Lee Jones albums
1989 albums
Geffen Records albums
Albums produced by Walter Becker